Sir Lincoln Carruthers Hynes  (12 April 1912 – 7 August 1977), also known as L. C. Hynes or Bob Hynes, was an Australian cricketer, radio and television manager, and hospital administrator. He played seventeen first-class matches for New South Wales between 1935/36 and 1938/39. He was the chairman of Royal North Shore Hospital from 1968 to 1977. Sir Joseph Carruthers was his maternal great-uncle.

See also
 List of New South Wales representative cricketers

References

External links
 

1912 births
1977 deaths
Australian cricketers
New South Wales cricketers
Cricketers from Sydney
Australian Knights Bachelor
Australian Officers of the Order of the British Empire
People educated at Sydney Boys High School
People educated at North Sydney Boys High School
Royal Australian Air Force personnel of World War II
Australian radio executives
Australian television executives
Australian chairpersons of corporations
Australian hospital administrators
Australian people of English descent
Australian people of Scottish descent
D. G. Bradman's XI cricketers